Allied Joint Force Command Brunssum (JFCBS) is a NATO command with its headquarters at Brunssum, the Netherlands. It was established in 2004 from previous commands as part of NATO's continuing command structure reductions in the face of a then-diminishing threat.

History

Allied Forces Central Europe from 1953 

Originally the command was known as Headquarters, Allied Forces Central Europe (AFCENT) when it was activated in August 1953 in Fontainebleau, outside Paris, France.

Ensuring interoperability among land forces of the different NATO Member States has always been a challenge, which is why a variety of NATO standardization activities, such as the NATO Standardization Office, have been underway since the 1950s.

After General Dwight D. Eisenhower was appointed as Supreme Allied Commander Europe (SACEUR) in 1950, he found that devising command arrangements in the Central Region, which contained the bulk of NATO’s forces, was to be complicated. General Eisenhower considered naming an overall Commander-in-Chief (CINC) for the Central Region but soon realized it would be difficult to find an arrangement that would satisfy all three major powers with forces in the Centre - the United States, United Kingdom and France - because their views on the proper relationship of air and ground power differed significantly. Moreover, he wanted to control the most important region, Central Region, himself.

Drawing upon his Second World War experience, Eisenhower decided to retain overall control himself and did not appoint a CINC for the Central Region. Instead there would be three separate commanders-in-chief (for Allied Air Forces Central Europe, Allied Land Forces Central Europe and Flag Officer Central Europe (FLAGCENT)), all reporting directly to SACEUR. Vice Admiral Robert Jaujard of the French Navy was appointed as Flag Officer Central Europe, and served from 2 April 51 until 20 August 1953. On 20 August 1953 General Ridgeway, Eisenhower's successor, established a single Commander-in-Chief (CINCENT) for the region with subordinate land, air and naval commanders (COMLANDCENT, COMAIRCENT, and COMNAVCENT respectively).

One of the command's exercises in the 1950s was Operation Counter Punch. Counter Punch was a September 1957 AFCENT air-ground military exercise that also tested NATO's integrated air-defense system in its central European front. The exercise involved the national air-defense systems of Britain, France, Belgium and the Netherlands, with Général d'Armée Jean-Étienne Valluy, French Army, NATO's Commander-in-Chief Allied Forces Central Europe (CINCENT), in overall command.  Operation Counter Punch revealed deficiencies in the Integrated NATO Air Defense System as well as air force responsiveness to theoretical Soviet and Warsaw Pact ground advances.

After July 1962 and the establishment of Commander Allied Forces Baltic Approaches (COMBALTAP), German naval forces were shifted into that command. Thereafter there was no longer any need for the small headquarters of Allied Naval Forces Central Europe and its two subordinate commands, and they were disestablished in 1962, leaving naval liaison provided by a US naval officer.

AFCENT remained in France under French command until 1967, when France removed itself from the military command structure. The headquarters was moved to Brunssum in 1967 and activated under German command.

Subordinate AFCENT commands in 1989 

During the Cold War, AFCENT commanded the following units:

 Allied Command Europe, in Mons, Belgium
 Allied Forces Central Europe (AFCENT), in Brunssum, Netherlands
 Northern Army Group (NORTHAG), at JHQ Rheindahlen, West Germany
 I Dutch Corps
 I German Corps
 I British Corps
 I Belgian Corps
 Central Army Group (CENTAG), in Heidelberg, West Germany
 III German Corps
 V US Corps
 VII US Corps
 II German Corps
 Allied Air Forces Central Europe (AAFCE), in Ramstein Air Base, West Germany
 Second Allied Tactical Air Force (2 ATAF)
 Fourth Allied Tactical Air Force (4 ATAF)

The III Corps (US) was allocated as NORTHAG reserve. On activation, it would have deployed to Europe from bases in the United States.  A forward element, 3rd Brigade, US 2nd Armored Division, was located at Garlstedt, Germany. The U.S. III Corps also maintained a forward headquarters at Tapijn Kazerne, Maastricht, Netherlands.

The commander of US Army Europe, Gen. William W. Crouch, assumed an additional role as commander of NATO LANDCENT on 15 February 1996. He was the first American to command LANDCENT since its 1993 activation. Originally, the LANDCENT command was to be rotated between German and Dutch generals. The dual command of United States Army Europe (USAREUR) and LANDCENT allowed the continued integration of US Army Europe into NATO's post-Cold War structure. All NATO corps, except for the :de:IV. Korps (Bundeswehr), were then multinational. In the mid-late 1990s there were four multinational main defence corps in NATO's Central Region: one Danish-German (LANDJUT), one Dutch-German (I GE/NL Corps) and two German-United States (II GE/US and V US/GE). In addition, an agreement was made which set out the arrangements under which the European Corps, consisting of units from Belgium, France, Germany, Luxembourg and Spain, would be made available to NATO in times of crisis. 
	
LANDCENT's missions were to:
Protect the peace and deter aggression in NATO's central region (Germany, Belgium, Luxemburg and the Netherlands). 
Plan, prepare and direct operations of land forces under NATO command. 
Plan, coordinate and conduct the land and air subcampaign jointly with NATO's Allied Air Command, Central. 
Develop plans for, and participate in, the MCP and Partnership for Peace (PfP) initiative. 
Support the flanks of the area of responsibilities. 
	
The departure from the Cold War era brought the implementation of a new NATO Integrated Military Structure and LandCENT was formally designated Joint Headquarters Centre (JHQ CENT) in a ceremony held on March 9, 2000.

Establishment of JFC Brunssum 
In 2000, the deactivation of Headquarters, Allied Forces Northern Europe (AFNORTH) in Kolsås, Norway led to the redesignation of AFCENT as Regional Headquarters, Allied Forces Northern Europe (RHQ AFNORTH).  The headquarters operated as RHQ AFNORTH until 2004, when it was renamed Allied Joint Force Command Brunssum (JFC-B) to add flexibility to the military command structure by removing regional restrictions.

Circa 2010, JFC Brussum appears to be responsible for Contingency Plan Eagle Guardian, NATO's Article 5 plan to defend Poland, Lithuania, Latvia, and Estonia.

Until March 2013 Command Component Land Heidelberg (FC Heidelberg (Land)), the land component command, was under the control of this headquarter and located at Heidelberg in Germany.

Facilities

Hendrik van Nassau-Ouwerkerk Camp 
Hendrik van Nassau-Ouwerkerk Camp  is the headquarters and main base area of JFC Brunssum.  Other organizations located on Hendrik van Nassau-Ouwerkerk Camp are the NATO Communication and Information Systems Services Agency, Sector Brunssum (NCSA-B) and the NATO Airborne Early Warning & Control Programme Management Agency (NAPMA).

Hendrik van Nassau-Ouwerkerk Camp also boasts an all ranks club called Club 13, a small tax-free department store called the B&S Store, a film theatre, a swimming pool, tennis courts and a gymnasium.  Additional services are provided by the AAFES on US Army Garrison Brunssum.

Static War Headquarters Castlegate

Static War Headquarters Castlegate is a NATO command and communications bunker located approximately 2 km north-east of the town of Linnich, Germany.  SWHQ Castlegate is operated in caretaker status by a German military contingent.

Commanders
The commander of JFC-B is known as Commander, Joint Force Command Brunssum.  The position was formerly known as Commander-in-Chief North (CINCNORTH) and Commander-in-Chief Central (CINCCENT).  JFC-B is normally commanded by a German General. Two Italian four-star generals commanded JFC-B for the great contribution of the Italian armed forces to NATO. The first five commanders were French. The current commander is General Jörg Vollmer of the German Army.

Notes

References

External links 
 

Formations of the NATO Military Command Structure
Military units and formations established in 2004
Organisations based in Limburg (Netherlands)
South Limburg (Netherlands)
Brunssum